Rosella Hartman (May 23, 1895 — March 5, 1984) was an American painter, etcher and lithographer. She studied at both the Art Institute of Chicago and  the Art Students League of New York. She was awarded a Guggenheim Fellowship in 1934 and 1938 to study graphic arts abroad. Hartman married a sculptor, Paul Fiene (1899–1949) and lived in Woodstock, New York, then a leading center for the arts. Examples of her work are included in the collections of the Whitney Museum of American Art and the Museum of Modern Art, New York.

References

1890s births
1984 deaths
20th-century American women artists
20th-century American artists